Pilkichha is a village in Khutahan, Jaunpur district, Varanasi division, Uttar Pradesh, India.

 Tehsil Name: Shahganj

 District: Jaunpur 
 State: Uttar Pradesh 
 Division: Varanasi 
 Language: Hindi and Urdu 
 Time zone: IST (UTC+5:30) 
 Elevation / Altitude: 84 meters above sea level 
 Telephone Code / Std Code: 05364 
 Pin Code: 223107 
 Post Office Name: Pilkichha

Overview of Pilkichha 

Pilkichha is 3rd biggest gram sbha in the Jaunpur district. There is a Gomti River in Pilkichha. It’s 100 Km from Prayagraj and around the same from Varansi.  

Jaunpur, Mau, Sultanpur, Azamgarh are the nearby Cities to Pilkichha.

Demographics of Pilkichha 

Hindi is the Local Language here.

Communications 

There is no railway station near to Pilkichha in less than 10 km. However Azamgarh railway station is major railway station 69 km near to Pilkichha

Education

Colleges near Pilkichha 

Gram Vikas Inter College Khuthan
Address :
National Intermediate College Pattinarendrapur
Address :
Madarsa Arbia Riyazul Ulom
Address : Baddopur. Shahganj. Jaunpur.u.p...india
Madarsa Darul Uloom
Address : Baddopur Shahganj Jaunpur
Mr.raviraj Post Greaduat College Nauli Jaunpur
Address : Nauli Jaunpur Up

Schools near Pilkichha 

Samajvadi I.c. Gabhiran
Address : gabhiran, khuthan, jaunpur, Uttar Pradesh . PIN- 222104

Inter College Ranipur
Address : rani pur, khuthan, jaunpur, Uttar Pradesh . PIN- 222104

Brijesh I.c.gulalpur
Address : gulal pura, khuthan, jaunpur, Uttar Pradesh . PIN- 222139, Post - Khetasarai

Baba M.d.j.h.s.mubarakpur
Address : mubarak pur, khuthan, jaunpur, Uttar Pradesh . PIN- 222104

Administrative division

Sub Villages in Pilkichha 
 Khobhariya
 Harikapura
 Kastura
 Kokana
 Malikpatti
 Nakabi
 Taniya
 Viasiya
 Daulatpur
 Tanaya
 Rampur

References 

Villages in Jaunpur district